Scott Milne Matheson Jr. (born Scott Milne Matheson III; July 15, 1953) is a United States circuit judge of the United States Court of Appeals for the Tenth Circuit. He has served on that court since 2010.

A native of Salt Lake City, Matheson graduated from Stanford University, attended Oxford University as a Rhodes Scholar, and received his Juris Doctor degree from the Yale Law School. After working in private practice for several years, Matheson became a law professor at the University of Utah S.J. Quinney College of Law, where he served as dean from 1998 to 2006. Matheson was the United States Attorney for the District of Utah from 1993 to 1997.

Early life and education 
Matheson was born and raised in Salt Lake City, Utah. His father, Scott M. Matheson, served as Governor of Utah from 1977 to 1985, his mother, Norma Matheson, served as First Lady of Utah, and his brother, Jim Matheson, served as a United States Representative from Utah from 2001 to 2015.

Matheson earned an Bachelors of Arts degree with distinction from Stanford University in 1975, where he won the Anna Laura Myers Prize for an outstanding undergraduate economics thesis. He then went to Magdalen College, Oxford, as a Rhodes Scholar, receiving a Master of Arts degree in modern history in 1977. He then attended the Yale Law School, where he was a notes editor for the Yale Law Journal and graduated with a Juris Doctor in 1980.

Professional career 
After graduating from law school, Matheson first worked as his father's campaign manager for the 1980 Utah gubernatorial election. In 1981, he entered private practice as an associate attorney at the Washington, D.C. litigation firm Williams & Connolly.

In 1985, Matheson joined the faculty of the S.J. Quinney College of Law at the University of Utah. There, Matheson primarily taught constitutional law, criminal law, and civil procedure. Matheson was also extensively involved in law administration and law reform efforts, serving as a vice-chair of the Utah Constitutional Revision Committee, a chair of the Utah Supreme Court Advisory Committee on the Rules of Evidence, and a member of the Utah State Bar Commission. Matheson was also involved in efforts to expand legal aid in Utah, establishing a Pro Bono Initiative at the S.J. Quinney College of Law and serving on the Board of Trustees of the Legal Aid Society of Salt Lake.

During his time as a law professor, Matheson contributed to various other institutions during leaves of absence. From 1988 to 1989, Matheson served as the Deputy County Attorney for Salt Lake County. From 1989 to 1990, Matheson was a visiting professor in the Frank Stanton Chair on the First Amendment at Harvard University's John F. Kennedy School of Government. From 1993 to 1997, Matheson was the United States Attorney for the District of Utah.

Matheson served as dean of the S.J. Quinney School of Law from 1998 to 2006. After concluding his deanship, Matheson spent his one-year sabbatical as a Public Policy Scholar at the Woodrow Wilson International Center for Scholars in Washington, DC.

From 2007 to 2008, Matheson chaired the Utah Mine Safety Commission, which was formed in response to the Crandall Canyon Mine disaster and charged with improving mine safety and disaster response in the state.

Matheson was also the unsuccessful Democratic candidate for Governor of Utah in 2004, losing to Republican Jon Huntsman Jr. with 41.4% of the vote.

Matheson is the author of the book Presidential Constitutionalism in Perilous Times (2009) and numerous law review articles.

Federal judicial service 
On March 3, 2010, President Barack Obama nominated Matheson to the United States Court of Appeals for the Tenth Circuit to replace Michael W. McConnell, who resigned in August 2009 to return to academia. Matheson's nomination was unanimously approved by the Senate Judiciary Committee.

However, sources such as the Fox News Channel and conservative magazine The Weekly Standard alleged that Obama hoped to influence Matheson's brother, Representative Jim Matheson, to vote for the Patient Protection and Affordable Care Act. According to The Salt Lake Tribune, "Rep. Jim Matheson called the claim simply absurd, as did the White House, Senator Orrin Hatch and pretty much everyone who knows the Mathesons."

Hatch, an establishment conservative Republican from Utah, supported Matheson and helped shepherd the nomination through the Senate. On December 22, 2010, the U.S. Senate confirmed the nomination. Matheson received his judicial commission on December 27, 2010.

Notable cases

Awad v. Ziriax, 670 F.3d 1111 (10th Cir. 2012): The court (per Judge Matheson, joined by Judges O’Brien and McKay) upheld a district court’s grant of a preliminary injunction to prevent the Oklahoma State Election Board from certifying a proposed amendment to the Oklahoma Constitution that would prevent Oklahoma state courts from using or considering Sharia law. 

Bandimere v. SEC, 844 F.3d 1168 (10th Cir. 2016): The court (per Judge Matheson, joined by Judge Briscoe, with Judge McKay dissenting) held that the Securities and Exchange Commission’s administrative-law judges were “inferior officers” subject to the Appointments Clause. The court’s decision opened a circuit split with the D.C. Circuit. Raymond J. Lucia Cos. v. SEC, 832 F.3d 277 (D.C. Cir. 2016), rehearing denied, 868 F.3d 1021, rev’d, 138 S. Ct. 2044 (2018). The Supreme Court granted certiorari on Lucia and agreed with the Tenth Circuit’s holding that the Securities and Exchange Commission’s administrative-law judges were “inferior officers.”

Hobby Lobby Stores, Inc. v. Sebelius, 723 F.3d 1114 (10th Cir. 2013) (en banc), aff’d, 134 S. Ct. 2751 (2014): Judge Matheson filed an opinion concurring in part and dissenting in part from the en banc majority’s decision that reversed the district court’s denial of a motion for a preliminary injunction in a challenge to a federal regulation that required employers to provide health insurance for employees that covered certain contraceptives. 

Little Sisters of the Poor v. Burwell, 794 F.3d 1151 (10th Cir. 2015), vacated and remanded, 136 S. Ct. 1557: A group of nonprofit religious employers challenged regulations by the Department of Health and Human Services that provided accommodations for religious objectors to a regulatory mandate to provide employees with health insurance coverage for contraceptives. Hearing appeals from the District of Colorado and Western District of Oklahoma, the Tenth Circuit (per Judge Matheson) held that preliminary injunctive relief was not warranted, concluding that the religious accommodation scheme established by the regulations relieved the plaintiffs of the contraceptive mandate, did not burden religious exercise in violation of RFRA, and did not infringe on First Amendment rights. The Supreme Court granted certiorari on the Tenth Circuit’s decision along with decisions from the Third, Fifth, and District of Columbia Circuits. On certiorari, the Supreme Court did not reach the merits. Rather, the Court vacated and remanded on narrow grounds, ordering the lower courts to examine a new argument that arose in supplemental briefing before the Court.  

Murphy v. Royal, 866 F.3d 1164 (10th Cir. 2017), amended and superseded on denial of rehearing en banc, 875 F.3d 896 (10th Cir. 2017), aff'd, 140 S.Ct. 2412 (2020) (per curiam): Patrick Dwayne Murphy, a prisoner convicted by an Oklahoma state court, filed a petition for a writ of habeas corpus in a federal district court. The Tenth Circuit (per Judge Matheson, joined by Chief Judge Tymkovich and Judge Phillips) applied the three-part test for the disestablishment or diminishment of an Indian reservation in Solem v. Bartlett, 465 U.S. 463 (1984), and found that Congress had not disestablished the Creek Reservation, which covered about half of modern-day Oklahoma and most of the city of Tulsa. As Murphy was an Indian charged with a crime that occurred in the Creek Reservation, the Oklahoma state court lacked jurisdiction over his charges. In the Tenth Circuit’s order denying rehearing en banc, Chief Judge Tymkovich wrote a concurrence that urged the Supreme Court to grant certiorari and reconsider the three-part test in Solem. The Supreme Court granted certiorari, but split 4-4 with Justice Gorsuch recused. The issue was then resolved by McGirt v. Oklahoma, 140 S. Ct. 2452 (2020), and the Supreme Court affirmed in Murphy in light of McGirt.

References

External links

|-

1953 births
21st-century American judges
Alumni of Magdalen College, Oxford
Latter Day Saints from Utah
American Rhodes Scholars
Judges of the United States Court of Appeals for the Tenth Circuit
Living people
Stanford University alumni
United States Attorneys for the District of Utah
United States court of appeals judges appointed by Barack Obama
University of Utah faculty
Utah Democrats
Yale Law School alumni
Williams & Connolly people